The 2020 Intercontinental GT Challenge was the fifth season of the Intercontinental GT Challenge. The season again features five rounds, starting with the Liqui Moly Bathurst 12 Hour on 2 February and concluding with the Kyalami 9 Hours on 12 December. Dennis Olsen is the defending Drivers' champion and Porsche is the defending Manufacturers' champion.

Calendar
At the annual press conference during the 2019 24 Hours of Spa on 26 July, the Stéphane Ratel Organisation announced the first draft of the 2020 calendar. The only change from 2019 was the North American round moving from Laguna Seca Raceway to the Indianapolis Motor Speedway, primarily because of event permit restrictions at Laguna Seca (which is owned by the local government). The Indianapolis event will form a revival of the Speedway's Harvest Auto Racing Classic.  The schedule was further changed on 22 May 2020 when the BH Auction SMBC Suzuka 10 Hours on 23 August was canceled because of Japanese entry restrictions as a result of the COVID-19 pandemic. Also, on 22 June 2020, it was announced as a result of the rescheduled 24 Hours of Spa, the race would be extended to 25 hours. The new date falls on the weekend Europe leaves summertime, so clocks are turned back one hour, so the race will run 25 hours, with the original 24 hours name retained. Finally the raced lasted for 24 hours and not for 25 hours.

Entry list

Notes

Race results

Championship standings
Scoring System
Championship points were awarded for the first ten positions in each race. Entries were required to complete 75% of the winning car's race distance in order to be classified and earn points, with the exception of Bathurst where a car simply had to cross the finish line to be classified. Individual drivers were required to participate for a minimum of 25 minutes in order to earn championship points in any race. A manufacturer only received points for its two highest placed cars in each round.

Driver's championship
The results indicate the classification relative to other drivers in the series, not the classification in the race.

Manufacturer's championship

See also
2020 GT World Challenge Europe
2020 GT World Challenge Europe Sprint Cup
2020 GT World Challenge Europe Endurance Cup
2020 GT World Challenge Asia
2020 GT World Challenge America

References

External links

 
2020 in motorsport